Archaeologists use the term Wilton culture to reference a unique set of stone tools that appear to define the last stage of the Late Stone Age in South Africa, spanning 8,000-4,000 years ago. Similar artifacts were later found in central and east Africa, and similarly referred to as Wilton culture. The culture is characterized by a greater number of tool types, distinguishing it from its predecessors.

It was first described by John Hewitt after he excavated with the collaboration of C. W. Wilmot a cave on the farm Wilton near Alicedale in the eastern Cape of South Africa.

Locations
Occupation sites include that at Kalambo Falls and the valley of Twyfelfontein. Additionally, a partially preserved camp dating to 2300 BC was found in Gwisho, near the Kafue River.

Characteristics
Its tools are broadly analogous to the European mesolithic Microliths, which are a common artifact type. Later examples of the culture however indicate usage of iron. There are sites in southern Africa which exhibit evidence of rock art by the Wilton people.

Gwisho
Tools developed in Gwisho were more sophisticated than those of its predecessors. The Wilton people in Gwisho developed a bone industry, which produced items such as awls, ornaments and composite arrows. They also constructed and utilized wooden tools to uproot edible roots, which was a staple in their diet. Most of their food supply came from harvesting edible matter.

It is speculated by anthropologists that all the people of Gwisho belonged to a single 'kinship group', a group of which all members are related to one another by ancestry or various alternative ways.

References

Upper Paleolithic cultures of Africa
Archaeology of Southern Africa